Štefan Bednár (15 May 1909 – 15 January 1976) was a Slovak painter. His work was part of the painting event in the art competition at the 1936 Summer Olympics. Bednár was an active member of Slovak Communist Party, which led to his imprisonment by Nazi German authorities during World War II.

References

1909 births
1976 deaths
20th-century Slovak painters
Slovak painters
Olympic competitors in art competitions
People from Myjava
Slovak communists